Rogers is an English patronymic surname deriving from the given name of Roger commonly used by the Normans and meaning "son of Roger".  Variants include Rodgers.

Most genealogists believe that the name Roger is derived from the pre-7th century Old English name Hrothgar, which means 'fame spear' ("hroð" fame or renown, "gari" spear), the first reference to which is in Beowulf, the Anglo-Saxon epic poem.

The surname was probably first introduced into England during the Anglo-Saxon settlement of Britain. The "Rogers" given name was probably first introduced to England after the Norman Conquest of 1066, and is first recorded as "Rogerus" in the Domesday Book of 1086. It was introduced to Ireland when the Anglo-Normans invaded in the 1170s. According to a 2020 study, those with the surname are more likely to have Viking ancestors.

The first recorded mention of the surname is in mid-13th-century England. Examples include William Rogger in the subsidy tax rolls of the county of Sussex in 1296, and Henry Rogeres in similar records for Worcestershire of 1327. The first recorded spelling of the surname is that of Richard Roger from 1263, in the "Archaeological Records" of the county of Kent during the reign of Henry III (1216–1272).

The surname is now found commonly throughout Britain, particularly in southern and western England, and also in Scotland and Wales. The surname was also taken from England to Ireland in Norman and later Cromwellian invasions. However, many occurrences of it in Ireland represent an Anglicisation of Mac Ruaidhrí and Mac Ruairí in the newer and current standard spelling.

In England and Wales it ranks as the 77th most common surname.

The surname is also popular in North America, where it was introduced during English colonisation. According to the 1990 United States Census, 'Rogers' ranked fifty-fourth in frequency among all reported surnames, accounting for 0.12% of the population. By the 2010 United States Census, 'Rogers' ranked sixty-ninth among all reported surnames.

A
 Aaron Rogers, Australian Rules footballer. 
 A. B. Rogers, American surveyor
 Abigail Rogers (1818–1869), American advocate for women's rights and women's education
 Agnes L. Rogers (1884–1943), Scottish educator and educational psychologist
 Ambrose Rogers, Gaelic footballer
 Abbie G. Rogers, first wife of Henry Huddleston Rogers
 Adela Rogers St. Johns, American writer, daughter of Earl Rogers
 Adrian Rogers, American Baptist pastor
 Allan Rogers, British politician
 Amerie Rogers, American singer Amerie
 Amy Keating Rogers, American screenwriter
 Andrew Rogers, British journalist
 Anthony A. C. Rogers, American politician
 Armani Rogers (born 1997), American football player
 Asa Rogers, American politician

B
 Barney Rogers, Zimbabwean cricketer
 Benjamin Rogers (disambiguation), one of several people
 Bernard Rogers, American composer
 Bernard W. Rogers, retired American general
 Benedict Rogers, British human rights activist
 B. H. "Johnny" Rogers, American politician
 Big Bubba Rogers, American wrestler Ray Traylor
 Bill Rogers (golfer)
 Bo Rogers, American football player
 Bobby Rogers, American Motown singer/songwriter, member of The Miracles
 Brandon Rogers (disambiguation), multiple people
 Brittany Rogers, Canadian Olympic gymnast
 Bruce Rogers (broadcaster), Canadian broadcaster
 Bruce Rogers (typographer), American typographer
 Bruce Holland Rogers, American writer
 Buck Rogers, fictional science character appearing in a range of media
 Buddy Rogers, one of several people
 Byron Rogers (author), Welsh essayist and biographer

C
 C. L. B. Rogers (1928–1996), Belizean politician
 Caitrin Rogers, American documentary film producer
 Carl Rogers (1902–1987), American psychologist
 Carlos Rogers (disambiguation), multiple people
 Cathy Rogers (born 1968), English television producer
 Charles Rogers (disambiguation), multiple people
 Chris Rogers (disambiguation), multiple people
 Christabella Rogers, English poet
 Claude Ambrose Rogers (1920–2005), English mathematician
 Claudette Rogers Robinson (born 1942), American singer-songwriter
 Clay Rogers (born 1980), American stock car racing driver
 Clement V. Rogers (1839–1911), American judge
 Clifford Joy Rogers (1897–1962), American politician
 Collin Rogers (1791–1845), American architect
 Corky Rogers (1943–2020), American football coach
 Craig G. Rogers (born 1971), American urologist
 Cullen Rogers (1921–1997), American football player

D
 D. J. Rogers (1948–2020), stage name of DeWayne Julius Rogers, American singer-songwriter, record producer, and musician
 Dale Evans Rogers, American singer-songwriter, wife of Roy Rogers
 Daniel Rogers, 1573–1652, English Puritan clergyman and religious writer
 Daniel Rogers, 1754–1806, early American politician and miller from Delaware
 Daniel Rogers, c. 1538–1591, Anglo-Flemish diplomat
 Danny Rogers (born 1994), Irish football goalkeeper
 Darryl Rogers, American football coach
 David Rogers, several people, includes Dave Rogers
 Dayton Leroy Rogers (born 1953), American serial killer
 Denis Rogers, former mayor of Hamilton, New Zealand
 Desiree Rogers, former White House social secretary
 Don Rogers, one of several people
 Doug Rogers, one of several people

E
 E. D. Rogers, American businessman and politician
 Earl Rogers, American trial lawyer
 Eamonn Rogers, Irish footballer
 Edith Rogers (Manitoba politician), Canadian politician
 Edith Nourse Rogers, American politician
 Edward S. Rogers, Sr., Canadian businessman
 Edward Samuel Rogers ("Ted" Rogers), Canadian businessman
 Edward Rogers III, president of Rogers Cable, son of Ted Rogers and grandson of Edward S. Rogers, Sr.
 Edwina Rogers, public policy consultant, former Executive Director at the Secular Coalition for America
 Effie Hoffman Rogers, American educator
 Elizabeth Rogers, American actress
 Ellen Rogers, British photographer
 Emma Winner Rogers, American writer, speaker, suffragist
 Erik Rogers, American singer
 Ernesto Nathan Rogers, Italian architect
 Everett Rogers, American scholar of innovation

F
 Fred Rogers, host of the American children's show Mister Rogers' Neighborhood on public television
 Fred Rogers (football coach), Drake University football coach for the 1896 season
 Frederic Rogers, 1st Baron Blachford, British civil servant
 Frederick Arundel Rogers (1876–1944), British archdeacon and plant collector

G
 Gabe Rogers, American basketball player
 Gabriel Rogers, British footballer
 T. Gary Rogers, American businessman
 George Rogers, one of several people
 Ginger Rogers, American actress and dancer
 Grace Rainey Rogers (1867–1943), American art collector, philanthropist
 Greg Rogers, Australian swimmer
 Gretchen Woodman Rogers (1881–1967), American painter

H
 Hal Rogers, American politician
 Harold A. Rogers, the founder of Kin Canada
 Harry Rogers (cricketer), English cricketer
 Hartley Rogers, Jr., American mathematician
 Henk Rogers, Tetris entrepreneur
 Henry Darwin Rogers, American geologist
 Henry Huttleston Rogers, American businessman

I
 Ian Rogers, one of several people
 Isaiah Rogers, American architect
 Ivan Rogers, British civil servant

J
 Jacob Rogers (born 1981), American football player
 Jacob S. Rogers (died 1901), American locomotive manufacturer
 James Rogers, one of several people
 Jane Rogers, one of several people
 Jean Rogers, American actress
 Jennifer Rogers, British statistician
 Jeffrey Rogers, British fashion designer and retailer
 Jeremy Rogers, (Born 1974) Electrical Engineer
 Jessie Rogers (born 1993), Brazilian-American pornographic actress
 Jim Rogers (born 1942), American money manager
 Jim Rogers, American entrepreneur and former attorney
 Jim Rogers, American businessman
 Jimmy Rogers (1924–1997), American musician
 Jimmy Rogers (American football) (born 1955), American football player
 Joel Rogers, American law professor
 Joel Augustus Rogers, Jamaican historian
 Joel Townsley Rogers, American writer
 Jodie Rogers (born 1970), Australian diver
 John Rogers, one of several people
 Josh Rogers (born 1994), American baseball player
 Judith Ann Wilson Rogers (born 1939), American judge
 Julian Rogers (born 1947), Caribbean broadcaster and journalist
 Julia Ellen Rogers (1866–1958), American author of natural science and educator

K
 Kasey Rogers, American actress
 Kate Rogers, Canadian musician
 Keith Rogers, Canadian broadcaster
 Kelis Rogers (born 1980), American singer and songwriter
 Kenneth Rogers (born 1977), American pastor, speaker, leader and teacher
 Kenny Rogers (1938–2020), American singer, songwriter and actor
 Kenny Rogers (baseball), American baseball player
Kent Rogers (1923–1944), American voice actor
 Kevin Rogers, one of several people
 Kristian Rogers, English footballer
 Kristina Curry Rogers, American paleontologist

L
 Leigh Rogers, British ice dancer
 Leonard Rogers, British physician
 Leonard James Rogers, British mathematician
 Lillian Rogers Parks, American writer, daughter of Margaret Parks
 Linda Rogers, Canadian poet
 Lisa Rogers, British television presenter

M
 Marc Rogers, Canadian bassist
 Margaret Rogers, one of several people
 Mark E. Rogers, American writer
 Marshall Rogers, comic book artist
 Martha E. Rogers, American nurse, researcher, theorist, and author
 Mary Rogers - American crime victim
 Mary (Mai) Huttleston Rogers Coe, daughter of Henry Huddleston Rogers
 Mat Rogers, Australian rugby league player
 Matthew Rogers, American singer
 Maurice Albert Windham Rogers, British soldier
 Michael Rogers, one of several people
 Michael J. Rogers, name used by American film director Ray Dennis Steckler
 Michele Rogers, American model
 Mick Rogers, one of several people
 Mimi Rogers, American actress

N
Nicola Rogers, British archaeologist
Nigel Rogers (1935-2022), British singer
 Norman Rogers, American DJ known as Terminator X
Norman McLeod Rogers (1894-1940), member of the Cabinet of Canadian Prime Minister William Lyon Mackenzie King

P
 Pamela Rogers Turner, American sex offender
 Patricia Helen Rogers, Canadian politician
 Paul Rogers (actor), British actor
 Paul Rogers (basketball), Australian basketball player
 Paul Rogers (politician), American politician
 Peter Rogers, British film director

R
 Ralph B. Rogers, American businessman
 Randolph Rogers, American artist
 Rex M. Rogers, American writer
Richard Rogers (disambiguation), several people, most notably:
 Richard Birdsall Rogers, Canadian engineer
 Richard Reid Rogers, governor of the Panama Canal
 Rip Rogers, American wrestler
 Robert Rogers, one of several people
 Robbie Rogers, American soccer player
 Rodney Rogers, NBA forward
 Roy Rogers, American cowboy actor
 Russell L. Rogers, American astronaut
 Ruth Rogers, American-born British chef

S
 S. E. Rogers, Canadian politician
 Sally Rogers, British actress
 Sam Rogers (fullback), American football player
 Samuel Rogers, British poet
 Samuel Shepard Rogers (1943–2017), American actor known as Sam Shepard
 Scott Rogers, American public service officer and musician
 Shaggy Rogers, fictional character from Scooby-Doo
 Sharon Rogers, American model
 Shaun Rogers (American football)
 Shelagh Rogers, Canadian broadcaster
 Shelby Rogers, American tennis player
 Sherman S. Rogers, New York politician
 Shorty Rogers, American jazz musician
 Sion Hart Rogers, American politician
 SirVincent Rogers, American football player
 Stan Rogers, Canadian folk singer
 Stanley Rogers, American politician
 Stanley R. H. Rogers, American author
 Stephen Rogers, Canadian politician
 Stephen Walter Rogers, American preacher, activist, writer, and editorialist
 Steve Rogers, one of several people
 Su Rogers, British architect
 Suzanne Rogers, American actress

T
 Taylor Rogers, American baseball player
 Ted Rogers (comedian), British comedian
 Thomas Rogers, one of several people
 Thorold Rogers, English economist, historian and Member of Parliament
 Tim Rogers (disambiguation), one of several people
 Todd Rogers, American beach volleyball player
 Tom Rogers (baseball), American baseball player
 Tommy Rogers, American wrestler
 Tommy Giles Rogers, Jr., musician
 Tony Rogers, one of several people
 Trevor Rogers (disambiguation), one of several people
 Tristan Rogers, Australian-American actor
 Tyler Rogers, American baseball player
 Tyler Rogers (gridiron football), American football player

W
 Warren Rogers (1922–2003), American journalist
 Wayne Rogers (1933–2015), American actor
 Will Rogers (1879–1935), American humorist and entertainer
 Will Rogers Jr. (1911–1993), American politician, son of Will Rogers
 William Rogers, one of several people
 Woodes Rogers (1679–1732), British privateer

See also
Rodgers

References

English-language surnames
Surnames of English origin
Patronymic surnames
Surnames from given names